The milkfish (Chanos chanos) is the sole living species in the family Chanidae. However, there are at least five extinct genera from the Cretaceous.
The repeating scientific name (tautonym) is from Greek  ( ‘mouth’).

The species has many common names. The Hawaiian name for the fish is awa, and in Tahitian it is ava. It is called bangús in the Philippines, where it is popularly known as the national fish, although the National Commission for Culture and the Arts has stated that this is not the case as it has no basis in Philippine law. Milkfish is also called bandeng or bolu in Indonesia.

Chanos chanos occurs in the Indian Ocean and across the Pacific Ocean, from South Africa to Hawaii and the Marquesas, from California to the Galapagos, north to Japan, south to Australia. A single specimen was reported in 2012 in the eastern Mediterranean Sea. 

Milkfishes commonly live in tropical offshore marine waters around islands and along continental shelves, at depths of 1 to 30 m. They also frequently enter estuaries and rivers.

Anatomy 

They have an elongated and almost compressed body, with a generally symmetrical and streamlined appearance, one dorsal fin, falcate pectoral fins and a sizable forked caudal fin. The head is small relative to the body. The mouth is small and toothless. The body is olive green, with silvery flanks and dark bordered fins. They have 13–17 dorsal soft rays, 8–10 anal soft rays and 31 caudal fin rays. There are numerous fine intramuscular bones, which may complicate human consumption of the fish (see "Consumption" below).

Biology
These fishes generally feed on algae and small invertebrates. They tend to school around coasts and islands with coral reefs.  The young fry live at sea for two to three weeks and then migrate during the juvenile stage to mangrove swamps, estuaries, and sometimes lakes, and return to sea to mature sexually and reproduce. Females spawn at night up to 5 million eggs in saline shallow waters.

Consumption 
The milkfish is an important seafood in Southeast Asia and some Pacific Islands. Because it is notorious for being much bonier than other food fish, deboned milkfish, called "boneless bangús" in the Philippines, has become popular in stores and markets. Despite the notoriety however, many people in the Philippines continue to enjoy the fish cooked regularly or even raw using kalamansi juice or vinegar to make kinilaw na bangus.

Popular presentations of milkfish in Indonesia include bandeng duri lunak (soft-boned milkfish, ikan bandeng is Indonesian for milkfish) from Central and East Java or bandeng presto, which is pressure cooked milkfish until the thorns are rendered tender, and bandeng asap or smoked milkfish. Either fresh or processed, milkfish is the popular seafood product of Indonesian fishing towns, such as Juwana near Semarang in Central Java, and Sidoarjo near Surabaya in East Java.

Milkfish is the most popular fish in Taiwanese cuisine, it is valued for its versatility as well as its tender meat and economical price. Popular presentations include as a topping for congee, pan fried, braised, and as fish balls. There is a milkfish museum in Anping District and city of Kaohsiung holds an annual milkfish festival.

Milkfish is an oily fish, and is rich in omega-3 fatty acids.

Aquaculture

History 
Milkfish aquaculture first occurred around 1800 years ago in the Philippines and spread to Indonesia, Taiwan, and into the Pacific. Traditional milkfish aquaculture relied upon restocking ponds by collecting wild fry. This led to a wide range of variability in quality and quantity between seasons and regions.

In the late 1970s, farmers first successfully spawned breeding fish. However, they were hard to obtain and produced unreliable egg viability. In 1980, the first spontaneous spawning happened in sea cages. These eggs were found to be sufficient to generate a constant supply for farms.

Farming methods 

Fry are raised in either sea cages, large saline ponds (Philippines), or concrete tanks (Indonesia, Taiwan). Once they reach , (eight years), 3–4 million eggs are produced each breeding cycle. This is mainly done using natural environmental cues. However, attempts have been made using gonadotropin-releasing hormone analogue (GnRH-A) to induce spawning. Some still use the traditional wild stock method — capturing wild fry using nets.
Milkfish hatcheries, like most hatcheries, contain a variety of cultures, for example, rotifers, green algae, and brine shrimp, as well as the target species. They can either be intensive or semi-intensive. Semi-intensive methods are more profitable at US$6.67 per thousand fry in 1998, compared with $27.40 for intensive methods. However, the experience required by labour for semi-intensive hatcheries is higher than intensive.
Milkfish nurseries in Taiwan are highly commercial and have densities of about 2000/L. Indonesia achieves similar densities, but has more backyard-type nurseries. The Philippines has integrated nurseries with grow-out facilities and densities of about 1000/L. 
The three methods of outgrowing are pond culture, pen culture, and cage culture.
 Shallow ponds are found mainly in Indonesia and the Philippines. These are shallow, brackish ponds with benthic algae, usually used as feed. They are usually excavated from nipa or mangrove areas and produce about 800 kg/ha/yr. Deep ponds (2–3 m) have more stable environments and their use began in 1970. They so far have shown less susceptibility to disease than shallow ponds.
 In 1979, pen culture was introduced in Laguna de Bay, which had high primary production. This provided an excellent food source. Once this ran out, fertilizer was applied. They are susceptible to disease.
 Cage culture occurs in coastal bays. These consist of large cages suspended in open water. They rely largely on natural sources of food.
Most food is natural (known as lab-lab) or a combination of phytoplankton and macroalgae. Traditionally, this was made on site; food is now made commercially to order.
Harvest occurs when the individuals are 20–40 cm long (250–500 g in weight). Partial harvests remove uniformly sized individuals with seine nets or gill nets. Total harvest removes all individuals and leads to a variety of sizes. Forced harvest happens when an environmental problem occurs, such as depleted oxygen due to algal blooms, and all stock is removed.
Possible parasites include nematodes, copepods, protozoa, and helminths. Many of these are treatable with chemicals and antibiotics.

Processing and marketing 
Traditional post-harvest processing include smoking, drying, and fermenting. Bottling, canning, and freezing are of recent origin.
Demand has been steadily increasing since 1950. In 2005, 595,000 tonnes were harvested worth US$616 million.

A trend toward value-added products is occurring. In recent years, the possibility of using milkfish juveniles as bait for tuna long-lining has started to be investigated, opening up new markets for fry hatcheries.

Golden bangus 
On April 21, 2012, a Filipino fisherman donated a milkfish with yellowish coloring to the Philippine Bureau of Fisheries and Aquatic Resources, which was later on called the "golden bangus".  However, the fish soon died, allegedly because of a lower level of oxygen in the pond to which it was transferred.

See also
 Sate Bandeng
 Milkfish congee

References

 Francisco José Poyato-Ariza, A revision of the ostariophysan fish family Chanidae, with special reference to the Mesozoic forms (Verlag Dr. Friedrich Pfeil, 1996)
 Bagarinao, T., 1994. Systematics, distribution, genetics and life history of milkfish, Chanos chanos. Environ. Biol. Fish. 39(1):23-41.

External links 

 
 Boneless Bangus
 FishBase entry for milkfish
 SEAFDEC milkfish hatchery info
 DA, Philippines, About Bangus
 

Chanidae
Fish of the Pacific Ocean
Fish of Southeast Asia
Fish of the Philippines
Philippine cuisine
Fish of the Red Sea
Fish of Hawaii
Fish of Micronesia
Fish of Palau

Fish described in 1775
Taxa named by Peter Forsskål
Extant Early Cretaceous first appearances